Thomas Davee (December 9, 1797 – December 9, 1841) was a United States representative from Maine. He was born in Plymouth, Massachusetts where he attended the common schools. Later, he moved to Maine, where he engaged in mercantile pursuits.

Davee was a member of the Maine House of Representatives in 1826 and 1827 and also served in the Maine Senate 1830–1832. He was the high sheriff of Somerset County, Maine in 1835 and postmaster of Blanchard, Maine from November 6, 1833, to March 24, 1837. He was elected as a Democrat to the Twenty-fifth and Twenty-sixth Congresses (March 4, 1837 – March 3, 1841) but was not a candidate for renomination in 1840.

After leaving Congress, Davee resumed mercantile pursuits. He was again a member of the Maine Senate in 1841 and served until his death in Blanchard, Maine, in 1841. He was buried in the Village Cemetery, Monson, Maine.

References

1797 births
1841 deaths
People from Piscataquis County, Maine
Speakers of the Maine House of Representatives
People from Plymouth, Massachusetts
Democratic Party Maine state senators
Maine sheriffs
People from Somerset County, Maine
Democratic Party members of the United States House of Representatives from Maine
19th-century American politicians